The North Crimean Canal (in the Soviet Union: North Crimean Canal of the Lenin's Komsomol of Ukraine) is a land improvement canal for irrigation and watering of Kherson Oblast in southern Ukraine and the Crimean Peninsula. The canal has multiple branches throughout Kherson Oblast and Crimea.

Preparation for construction began in 1957, soon after the transfer of Crimea to the Ukrainian Soviet Socialist Republic in 1954. The main project works took place in three stages between 1961 and 1971.  The construction was conducted by the Komsomol members sent by the Komsomol travel ticket (Komsomolskaya putyovka) as part of shock construction projects and accounted for some 10,000 volunteer workers.

Ukraine shut down the canal in 2014 soon after Russia annexed Crimea. Russia restored the flow of water in March 2022 during the 2022 Russian invasion of Ukraine.

A 2015 study found that the canal had been providing 85% of Crimea's water prior to the 2014 shutdown.  Of the water from the canal, 72% went to agriculture and 10% to industry, while water for drinking and other public uses made up 18%.

Overview
From there, a pipeline carries water to supply the city of Kerch at the eastern extreme of the Crimean Peninsula. Seven water reservoirs lie along the main canal – they are Mizhhirne, Feodosiiske, Frontove, Leninske, Samarlynske, Starokrymske and Stantsiine (Kerchenske).

In Crimea, numerous smaller canals branch off the main channel, including the Razdolne rice canal, Azov rice canal, Krasnohvardiiske distribution canal, Uniting canal, and Saky canal. Through these, water is also supplied to the city of Simferopol.

The idea to construct the canal was raised in the 19th century, particularly by the Russian-Finnish botanist Christian von Steven. It was not until after World War II when the decision was adopted in September 1950 by the Central Committee of the Communist Party of the Soviet Union and the Government of the Soviet Union. The decision was to build the Kakhovka Hydro Electric Station, South Ukrainian and North Crimean canals. In 1951 the Soviet postal service released a commemorative post stamp where the North Crimean Canal was categorized as one of the Great Construction Projects of Communism. 

Construction of the canal and irrigation systems began in 1957 and was carried out in several stages. The first stage opened in October 1963, carrying water as far as Krasnoperekopsk in the north. In 1965 the canal was completed as far as the city of Dzhankoi in the center of Crimea. In 1971 the city of Kerch was reached. In December 1976 the canal was officially put into operation.

2014–2022

After the Maidan revolution and the subsequent Russian annexation of Crimea in March 2014, Ukrainian authorities greatly reduced the volume of water flowing to the peninsula via the canal, citing a huge outstanding debt owed by Crimea for water supplied in 2013. The reduction caused the peninsula's agricultural harvest, which is heavily dependent on irrigation, to fail in 2014.

Crimean water sources were connected to the North Crimean Canal to replace the former Ukrainian sources.  The objective was to restore irrigation and urban supplies to the Kerch Peninsula and to smaller communities on the east coast of Crimea. In 2014, a reservoir was built to store water of the rivers of Eastern Crimea near the village of Novoivanovka, Nyzhnohirskyi Raion. The North Crimean Canal is connected with the Novoivanovka reservoir.

According to official Russian statistics, the Crimean agricultural industry fully overcame the consequences of the blocking of the North Crimean Canal and crop yields grew by a factor of 1.5 from 2013 by 2016. The reported rapid growth in agricultural production in Crimea is due to the fact that, with the help of subsidies in the order of 2–3 billion rubles a year from the budget of the Russian Federation, agricultural producers in Crimea were able to increase their fleet of agricultural machinery.

These official statistics contrast with reports of a massive shrinkage in the area under cultivation in Crimea, from 130,000 hectares in 2013 to just 14,000 in 2017, and an empty canal and a nearly dry reservoir resulting in widespread water shortages, with water only being available for three to five hours a day in 2021. That same year, the New York Times cited senior American officials as stating that securing Crimea's water supply could be an objective of a possible incursion by Russia into Ukraine.

On 24 February 2022, the first day of the 2022 Russian invasion of Ukraine, Russian troops advancing from Crimea established control over the North Crimean Canal. The Head of the Republic of Crimea, Sergey Aksyonov, told local authorities to prepare the canal to receive water from the Dnieper river and resume the supply of water. Two days later, Russian forces used explosives to destroy the dam that had been blocking the flow since 2014, and water supply resumed.

Gallery

References

1975 establishments in Ukraine
Canals in Kherson Oblast
Canals in Crimea
Canals opened in 1975
History of Crimea
CNorth Crimean
Geography of Crimea
Irrigation projects
Interbasin transfer
Irrigation canals
Irrigation in Russia
Kakhovka Raion